Armando Ferreira Gomes (born 9 December 1970) is a retired Portuguese football defender.

References

1970 births
Living people
People from Paços de Ferreira
Portuguese footballers
F.C. Paços de Ferreira players
Leça F.C. players
Leixões S.C. players
Association football defenders
Primeira Liga players
Sportspeople from Porto District